Vilva is a rural locality (a settlement) and the administrative center of Vilvenskoye Rural Settlement, Dobryansky District, Perm Krai, Russia. The population was 966 as of 2010. There are 24 streets.

Geography 
Vilva is located 49 km northeast of Dobryanka (the district's administrative centre) by road. Bokovaya is the nearest rural locality.

References 

Rural localities in Dobryansky District